Bill Bergson and the White Rose Rescue (original Swedish title: Mästerdetektiven och Rasmus) is a 1953 Swedish film. It is based on the novel with the same name, written by Astrid Lindgren.

About the film
The film had premiere at the cinema Olympia in Stockholm on 16 November 1953. The film was recorded at Bogesund (Vaxholm), Sala and in studio in Stockholm.

There are differences between the book and this film:
"Vita Rosen" (Kalle, Anders and Eva-Lotta) see the kidnapping after "waring" to "Röda Rosen" but here they see it from a hut where they slept.
In the book, Nicke is not arrested, and "Röda Rosen" (Sixten, Benka and Jonte) don't make birds by the document papers.
When the kidnappers are escaping with the floatplane, Kalle cuts one of the plane's floats, but here he instead uses a rope tying the plane on a boat where policeman Björk sits and then the plane can't go upwards.

Selected cast
Lars-Erik Lundberg as Kalle Blomkvist
Inger Axö as Eva-Lotta
Peder Dam as Anders
Eskil Dalenius as Rasmus
Björn Berglund as the professor, Rasmus' father
Sigge Fürst as policeman Björk
Ulf Johanson as Engineer Peters, chief of the kidnapper-group
Gustaf Hiort af Ornäs as Berggren, kidnapper
Birger Åsander as Blom, kidnapper
Elof Ahrle as Nicke, kidnapper
Arne Källerud as Kalle Blomkvist's father
Solveig Hedengran as Kalle Blomkvist's mother
Britta Brunius as Eva-Lotta's mother
Börje Mellvig as disponent Stenberg

References
 
 

1953 films
Films based on Bill Bergson
1950s Swedish-language films
Films directed by Rolf Husberg
Swedish black-and-white films
Swedish children's films
1950s Swedish films